Vulcain (M611) is a Vulcain-class minesweeper of the French Navy. She is classed by the French Navy as a BBPD type vessel (French: bâtiment-base de plongeurs démineurs) and is used as a base ship for clearance divers. She is based in Cherbourg Naval Base, in Cherbourg, France, and is run by the 1st GPD Groupement de Plongeurs démineurs, a group of French Army clearance divers. Since 16 May 1987, she has been symbolically linked with the town of Honfleur. The personnel on board usually comprises 12 divers, 1 medical officer and 1 nurse.

Other BBPDs of the Vulcain type are:
BBPD Styx - M614
BBPD Pluton - M622
BBPD Achéron - A613

See also
List of active French Navy ships

Minesweepers of the French Navy
Ships built in France
1986 ships